Nenad Nastić (born 8 May 1981) is a Serbian former footballer.

He started playing in a minor club, FK Elan Srbobran, before starting to play with Serbian top league clubs such as FK Zvezdara, FK Železnik and, his most notable years, with FK Vojvodina. He also had spells abroad with Bulgarian CSKA Sofia and Russian FC Khimki before returning to Serbia to play with FK Jagodina.

Honours
CSKA Sofia
Bulgarian League: 2007–08

External sources
 Nenad Nastić Profile at Srbijafudbal.
 Nenad Nastić Stats at Utakmica.rs

1981 births
Living people
Serbian footballers
Association football defenders
FK Zvezdara players
FK Železnik players
FK Vojvodina players
PFC CSKA Sofia players
FC Khimki players
FK Jagodina players
FK Leotar players
FK Timok players
FK Modriča players
FK Proleter Novi Sad players
FK TSC Bačka Topola players
Serbian SuperLiga players
First Professional Football League (Bulgaria) players
Russian Premier League players
Expatriate footballers in Bulgaria
Expatriate footballers in Russia
Expatriate footballers in Bosnia and Herzegovina
Serbian expatriate sportspeople in Bulgaria
Serbian expatriate sportspeople in Russia
Serbian expatriate sportspeople in Bosnia and Herzegovina
People from Srbobran